John Warwick King (26 December 1856 – 14 January 1927) was a Progressive party member of the House of Commons of Canada. He was born in Smiths Falls, Canada West and became a farmer and teacher.

King attended public school at Bluevale. For 17 years he was a public school teacher in the province, then became an agriculturalist. King once served as treasurer Turnberry Township.

He was first elected to Parliament at the Huron North riding in the 1921 general election then re-elected there in 1925 and 1926.

King died on 14 January 1927 of a heart attack at his home in Bluevale, before the end of his term in the 16th Canadian Parliament. His wife, née Annie Olive Schoales, died in May 1926.

References

External links
 

1856 births
1927 deaths
Canadian farmers
Members of the House of Commons of Canada from Ontario
Progressive Party of Canada MPs